Andrey da Silva Ventura (born 17 July 1993), simply known as Andrey, is a Brazilian footballer who plays as a goalkeeper.

Club career
Born in Rio de Janeiro, Andrey finished his formation with Botafogo. On 16 July 2014 he made his first team – and Série A – debut, starting in a 0–1 away loss against Sport Recife.

Andrey appeared in four matches during the campaign, suffering team relegation. On 22 January 2015 he rescinded his link with the club, moving to Botafogo-SP shortly after. He was part of the team that won the 2015 Campeonato Brasileiro Série D.

He was loaned to Cabofriense in January 2016, reuniting with former coach Eduardo Hungaro.

International career
Andrey was called to the Brazil under-23 side that played in the Football at the 2015 Pan American Games – Men's tournament, starting all the five matches as Brazil won the bronze medal.

Sexual assault allegation
In 2015, Andrey represented Brazil at the Pan American Games. The Toronto Police Service issued arrest warrants for him and teammate Lucas Piazon, on charges of sexual assault of a 21-year-old woman whom they met at the Drake nightclub; allegedly, Piazon and Ventura entered the woman's bedroom after she had gone to sleep and then assaulted her. The police stated that due to the limited nature of the Ontario-wide nature of the warrant, "we can't go through the extradition process."

The charges against Piazon were later dropped, although the charges against Andrey Ventura still stand.

Personal life
Andrey is the brother of Andrew, who is also a Brazilian football goalkeeper.

References

External links

1993 births
Living people
Footballers from Rio de Janeiro (city)
Brazilian footballers
Association football goalkeepers
Campeonato Brasileiro Série A players
Campeonato Brasileiro Série B players
Campeonato Brasileiro Série C players
Botafogo de Futebol e Regatas players
Botafogo Futebol Clube (SP) players
Esporte Clube São Bento players
Volta Redonda FC players
Sampaio Corrêa Futebol Clube players
Clube de Regatas Brasil players
Footballers at the 2015 Pan American Games
Pan American Games bronze medalists for Brazil
Pan American Games medalists in football
Medalists at the 2015 Pan American Games